Ralph Richardson (1848–1895) was a 19th-century Member of Parliament in Nelson, New Zealand.

Biography

Richardson was born in Capenhurst, Cheshire, England.  He came to New Zealand on the Maori in 1851. He was the son of Dr Ralph Richardson and Marie Louise Richardson. His father was a Member of the Legislative Council from 1853 to 1856.

He resigned on 31 March 1873 "owing to urgent private affairs which require[d his] immediate departure for England".

Richardson lived in London for the later part of his life.

References

1848 births
1895 deaths
Members of the New Zealand House of Representatives
People from Nelson, New Zealand
New Zealand MPs for South Island electorates
People from Cheshire West and Chester
English emigrants to New Zealand
19th-century New Zealand politicians